The 2019 French Open was a major tennis tournament played on outdoor clay courts. It was held at the Stade Roland Garros in Paris, France, from 26 May to 9 June, comprising singles, doubles and mixed doubles play. Junior and wheelchair tournaments were also scheduled. Rafael Nadal was the two-time defending champion in men's singles and won his record 12th French Open singles title. Simona Halep was the defending champion in women's singles, but lost in the quarterfinals; the title was won by Ashleigh Barty.

It was the 123rd edition of the French Open and the second Grand Slam event of 2019. The main singles draws included 16 qualifiers for men and 12 for women out of 128 players in each draw. This was in contrast to two other Grand Slam tournaments – the Australian Open and Wimbledon, which from 2019 increased the number of women qualifiers to 16, to match with the US Open.

2019 was the final year in which there was no roof on any of the Roland-Garros tennis courts. On 5 June 2019, the entire day's tennis was washed out due to heavy rain. It is also the only Grand Slam to retain the advantage set in the final sets, whereas Australian Open and Wimbledon have now switched to tiebreaks.

Tournament

The 2019 French Open is the 123rd edition of the French Open and is held at Stade Roland Garros in Paris. A new shot clock that gives 25 seconds for the player serving, between points are introduced. In the juniors tournament, service lets won't be featured.

The tournament is an event run by the International Tennis Federation (ITF) and is part of the 2019 ATP Tour and the 2019 WTA Tour calendars under the Grand Slam category. The tournament consisted of both men's and women's singles and doubles draws as well as a mixed doubles event.

There is a singles and doubles events for both boys and girls (players under 18), which is part of the Grade A category of tournaments, and singles and doubles events for men's and women's wheelchair tennis players under the Grand Slam category, also hosting singles and doubles events for wheelchair quad tennis for the first time. The tournament is played on clay courts and took place over a series of 23 courts, including the three main showcourts, Court Philippe Chatrier, Court Suzanne Lenglen and the newly opened Court Simonne Mathieu.

Points and prize money

Points distribution
Below is a serie of tables for each of the competitions showing the ranking points on offer for each event.

Senior points

Wheelchair points

Junior points

Prize money
The total prize money for the 2019 edition is €42,661,000, an increase of 8% over 2018. The winners of the men's and women's singles title receive €2,300,000, an increase of €100,000 compared to 2018.

* per team

Singles players 
2019 French Open – Men's singles

2019 French Open – Women's singles

Day-by-day summaries

Singles seeds
The following are the seeded players and notable players who have withdrawn from the event. Seedings are based on ATP and WTA rankings as of 20 May 2019. Rank and points before are as of 27 May 2019.

Men's singles

† The player did not qualify for the tournament in 2018. Accordingly, points for his 18th best result are deducted instead.

The following players would have been seeded, but they withdrew from the event.

Women's singles

Doubles seeds

Men's doubles

1 Rankings are as of 20 May 2019.

Women's doubles

1 Rankings are as of 20 May 2019.

Mixed doubles

1 Rankings are as of 27 May 2019.

Main draw wildcard entries
The following players were given wildcards to the main draw based on internal selection and recent performances.

Men's singles 
  Grégoire Barrère
  Quentin Halys
  Antoine Hoang
  Maxime Janvier
  Nicolas Mahut
  Corentin Moutet
  Tommy Paul
  Alexei Popyrin

Women's singles 
  Audrey Albié
  Lauren Davis
  Priscilla Hon
  Séléna Janicijevic
  Chloé Paquet
  Diane Parry
  Jessika Ponchet
  Harmony Tan

Men's doubles 
 Grégoire Barrère /  Quentin Halys
 Elliot Benchetrit /  Geoffrey Blancaneaux
 Benjamin Bonzi /  Antoine Hoang
 Mathias Bourgue /  Jonathan Eysseric
 Enzo Couacaud /  Tristan Lamasine
 Hugo Gaston /  Clément Tabur
 Manuel Guinard /  Arthur Rinderknech

Women's doubles 
 Julie Belgraver /  Mylène Halemai
 Loudmilla Bencheikh /  Cori Gauff
 Estelle Cascino /  Elixane Lechemia
 Aubane Droguet /  Séléna Janicijevic
 Fiona Ferro  /  Diane Parry
 Amandine Hesse /  Jessika Ponchet
 Chloé Paquet /  Pauline Parmentier

Mixed doubles
 Manon Arcangioli /  Tristan Lamasine
 Alizé Cornet /  Jonathan Eysseric
 Amandine Hesse /  Benjamin Bonzi
 Chloé Paquet /  Benoît Paire
 Pauline Parmentier /  Fabrice Martin
 Margot Yerolymos /  Grégoire Barrère

Main draw qualifiers

Men's singles

Men's Singles Qualifiers
  Tennys Sandgren
  Salvatore Caruso
  Elliot Benchetrit
  Mikael Ymer
  Simone Bolelli
  Alexey Vatutin
  Thiago Monteiro 
  Yannick Maden
  Pedro Martínez 
  Kimmer Coppejans
  Blaž Rola 
  Guillermo García López
  Stefano Travaglia
  Alexandre Müller
  Yannick Hanfmann
  Rudolf Molleker

Lucky Losers
  Sergiy Stakhovsky
  Lukáš Rosol
  Oscar Otte
  Henri Laaksonen
  Alejandro Davidovich Fokina

Women's singles

Women's Singles Qualifiers
  Bernarda Pera 
  Kristína Kučová
  Kurumi Nara 
  Aliona Bolsova
  Varvara Lepchenko
  Giulia Gatto-Monticone 
  Antonia Lottner 
  Sofya Zhuk 
  Anna Blinkova 
  Liudmila Samsonova 
  Jasmine Paolini 
  Elena Rybakina

Lucky Losers
  Marie Bouzková
  Tímea Babos
  Kaja Juvan

Protected ranking
The following players were accepted directly into the main draw using a protected ranking:

 Men's singles
  Jozef Kovalík (PR 85)
  Cedrik-Marcel Stebe (PR 95)
  Janko Tipsarević (PR 88)
  Jo-Wilfried Tsonga (PR 34)

 Women's singles
  Shelby Rogers (PR 81)
  Anna Tatishvili (PR 107)

Note: Steve Darcis, who would have been placed on the men's entry list on the initial entry cutoff date of 15 April 2019 with a protected ranking of #90, entered late and played the qualifying tournament but lost in the third round.

Withdrawals
The following players were accepted directly into the main draw, but withdrew with injuries or other reasons.

 Men's singles
 Before the tournament
  Kevin Anderson → replaced by  Maximilian Marterer
  Félix Auger-Aliassime → replaced by  Alejandro Davidovich Fokina
  Tomáš Berdych → replaced by  Sergiy Stakhovsky
  John Isner → replaced by  Roberto Carballés Baena
  Nick Kyrgios → replaced by  Oscar Otte
  Sam Querrey → replaced by  Henri Laaksonen
  Milos Raonic → replaced by  Lukáš Rosol
  Andrey Rublev → replaced by  Filip Krajinović

 Women's singles
 Before the tournament
  Katie Boulter → replaced by  Marie Bouzková
  Camila Giorgi → replaced by  Tímea Babos
  Petra Kvitová → replaced by  Kaja Juvan
  Ekaterina Makarova → replaced by  Anna Tatishvili
  Maria Sharapova → replaced by  Mandy Minella

During the tournament
  Bianca Andreescu

Champions

Seniors

Men's singles

  Rafael Nadal def.  Dominic Thiem, 6–3, 5–7, 6–1, 6–1

Women's singles

  Ashleigh Barty def.  Markéta Vondroušová, 6–1, 6–3

Men's doubles

  Kevin Krawietz /  Andreas Mies def.  Jérémy Chardy /  Fabrice Martin, 6–2, 7–6(7–3)

Women's doubles

  Tímea Babos /  Kristina Mladenovic def.  Duan Yingying /  Zheng Saisai, 6–2, 6–3

Mixed doubles

  Latisha Chan /  Ivan Dodig def.  Gabriela Dabrowski /  Mate Pavić,  6–1, 7–6(7–5)

Juniors

Boys' singles

  Holger Vitus Nødskov Rune def.  Toby Alex Kodat, 6–3, 6–7(5–7), 6–0

Girls' singles

  Leylah Annie Fernandez def.  Emma Navarro, 6–3, 6–2

Boys' doubles

  Matheus Pucinelli de Almeida  /  Thiago Agustín Tirante def.  Flavio Cobolli /  Dominic Stricker, 7–6(7–3), 6–4

Girls' doubles

  Chloe Beck /  Emma Navarro def.   Alina Charaeva /  Anastasia Tikhonova, 6–1, 6–2

Wheelchair events

Wheelchair men's singles

  Gustavo Fernández def.  Gordon Reid, 6–1, 6–3

Wheelchair women's singles

  Diede de Groot def.  Yui Kamiji, 6–1, 6–0

Wheelchair quad singles

  Dylan Alcott def.  David Wagner, 6–2, 4–6, 6–2

Wheelchair men's doubles

  Gustavo Fernández /  Shingo Kunieda def.  Stéphane Houdet /  Nicolas Peifer, 2–6, 6–2, [10–8]

Wheelchair women's doubles

  Diede de Groot /  Aniek van Koot def.  Marjolein Buis /  Sabine Ellerbrock, 6–1, 6–1

Wheelchair quad doubles

  Dylan Alcott /  David Wagner def.  Ymanitu Silva /  Koji Sugeno, 6–3, 6–3

Other events

Legends under 45 doubles

  Sébastien Grosjean /  Michaël Llodra def.  Juan Carlos Ferrero /  Andriy Medvedev, 7–6(7–4), 7–5

Legends over 45 doubles

  Sergi Bruguera /  Goran Ivanišević def.  Mikael Pernfors /  Mats Wilander, 6–2, 4–6, [10–4]

Women's legends doubles

  Nathalie Dechy /  Amélie Mauresmo def.  Martina Navratilova /  Dinara Safina, 6–3, 6–4

Sponsors
 BNP Paribas
 Peugeot
 Rolex
 Oppo
 Emirates
 Infosys
 Engie
 Lacoste
 Perrier
 Jersey Mike's Subs
 Brighthouse Financial
Just for Men
Franklin Templeton Investments

References

External links

 Roland Garros

 
2019 ATP Tour
2019 WTA Tour
2019 in tennis
2019 in Paris